Habib Public School is a school based in Karachi. It is situated in Sultanabad, M.T Khan road, Karachi, Pakistan.

Admission
Every year test for admission take place for class 1 and other classes as per the seats available. Thousands of students take the competitive admission test in which few are selected as successful candidates for admission.

History

The School started on 7 July 1959 (11th Zilqad) with four blocks of buildings,  named  Ahmed House,  Ghulam Ali House,  Dawood House  and Sharif House.  The first administrator of the School was the late Mr. Yousuf Qasim. School started with only 41 students and now approximately has 2000 students.

Notable alumni

 Sohail Abbas, Hockey player
 Shahid Khaqan Abbasi, Prime Minister (Pakistan)
 Mansoor Ahmad, Hockey Goalkeeper
 Ahmad Alam, Hockey Goal Keeper
 Kamran Ashraf, Hockey Player
 Syed Abbas Haider Bilgrami, Olympian (Hockey)
 Hussain Haqqani, Journalist
 Qamar Ibrahim, Olympian (Hockey)
 Shoaib Mohammad, Cricketer
 Raza Rabbani, Chairman Senate (Pakistan)
 Hassan Sardar, Olympian (Hockey)

References

External links

House of Habib
Schools in Karachi
Educational institutions established in 1959
1959 establishments in Pakistan